The 1984 UEFA European Under-21 Championship was the 4th staging of the UEFA European Under-21 Championship. The qualifying stage spanned two years (1982–84) and had 30 entrants. Albania, Iceland and Wales competed in the competition for the first time. England U-21s won the competition for the second time running.	

The 30 national teams were divided into eight groups (six groups of 4 + two groups of 3).    The group winners played off against each other on a two-legged home-and-away basis until the winner was decided.  There was no finals tournament or third-place playoff.

Qualifying stage

Draw
The allocation of teams into qualifying groups was based on that of UEFA Euro 1984 qualifying tournament with several changes, reflecting the absence of some nations:
 Groups 1, 2 and 4 included the same nations
 Group 3 did not include Luxembourg (moved to Group 8)
 Group 5 did not include Sweden (moved to Group 8)
 Group 6 did not include Northern Ireland 
 Group 7 did not include Malta and Republic of Ireland
 Group 8 composed of Sweden (moved from Group 5), Luxembourg (moved from Group 3) and France (who did not participate in senior Euro qualification)

Qualified teams

1 Bold indicates champion for that year

Squads
See 1984 UEFA European Under-21 Championship squads

Knockout stages

References

External links
 Results Archive at uefa.com
 RSSSF Results Archive ''at rsssf.com

 
UEFA European Under-21 Championship
UEFA
UEFA
1984 in youth association football